The Sandgate Hawks Sporting Club is an Australian rules football and netball club located in the Brisbane suburb of Taigum. They were nicknamed both the Hawks and Sea Hawks and their club colours were bottle green and red. The football squad plays in the Queensland Australian Football League.

History
Sandgate was established in 1943, and entered to play Senior football in 1944. They competed in every season until 1992 before merging with Windsor-Zillmere to form "The Northern Eagles". Due to fall outs between the administrators of Sandgate and Windsor Zillmere, Sandgate split from the arrangement and returned to play as a member of the now defunct Brisbane Football League winning back to back premierships in 1993 and 1994. Sandgate's most successful era was the 1970s when they won four premierships and participated in the finals of every season.

A revamped club, Sandgate AFC, currently competes in the Pineapple Hotel Cup division of the Queensland State Football League (QSFL)

Brisbane Lions ruckman Jamie Charman is the club's number one ticket holder. Jamie played juniors for the Sandgate Hawks for more than ten seasons.

Honours

Club
 Queensland Australian Football League (6): 1956, 1957, 1970, 1971, 1974, 1979
 BAFL (2): 1993, 1994

Individual
Grogan Medalists (2)
 Edgar Stevens 1950
 Don Smith 1973,1979

AFLQ Team Of The Century (3)
Dick Verdon - Full Back
Don Smith - Centre Half Back
John Stackpoole - Half Forward Flank

References

External links

Official website
Fullpointsfooty

Sandgate
Australian rules football clubs in Brisbane
1943 establishments in Australia
Sports clubs established in 1943
Australian rules football clubs established in 1943
Netball teams in Queensland